Ala ud-Din Masud Shah (died 10 June 1246) was the seventh sultan of the Delhi Sultanate.

Life 
He was the son of Rukn ud-Din Firuz (1236), son of Sultan Illtutmish and Shah Turkan and the nephew of Sultan Raziyyat (1236–40). After his predecessor and uncle Muiz ud-Din Bahram was murdered by the army in 1242 after years of disorder, the chiefs chose for him to become the next ruler of Delhi. However, he was more of a puppet for the chiefs and did not actually have much power or influence in the government. Instead, he became infamous for his fondness for entertainment and wine. Like his predecessor, he was considered "incompetent and worthless."  By 1246, the chiefs became upset with his increasing hunger for more power in the government, and executed him, replacing him with  Nasiruddin Mahmud Shah.

Coins
Gold, Silver and Billon coins are known for Ala ud-Din Masud Shah. Gold and silver coins were issued from Lakhnau and Delhi. Billon coins were struck from  Budaun and Delhi.

See also
Mamluk dynasty of Delhi
History of India
Islamic history
List of Indian monarchs

References

External links
India Through the Ages
Delhi Sultanat Coin Gallery

Sultans of the Mamluk dynasty (Delhi)
Indian Sunni Muslims
13th-century Indian monarchs
13th-century Indian Muslims